In cryptography, a private information retrieval (PIR) protocol is a protocol that allows a user to retrieve an item from a server in possession of a database without revealing which item is retrieved. PIR is a weaker version of 1-out-of-n oblivious transfer, where it is also required that the user should not get information about other database items.

One trivial, but very inefficient way to achieve PIR is for the server to send an entire copy of the database to the user. In fact, this is the only possible protocol (in the classical or the quantum setting) that gives the user information theoretic privacy for their query in a single-server setting. There are two ways to address this problem: make the server computationally bounded or assume that there are multiple non-cooperating servers, each having a copy of the database.

The problem was introduced in 1995 by Chor, Goldreich, Kushilevitz and Sudan in the information-theoretic setting and in 1997 by Kushilevitz and Ostrovsky in the computational setting. Since then, very efficient solutions have been discovered. Single database (computationally private) PIR can be achieved with constant (amortized) communication and k-database (information theoretic) PIR can be done with  communication.

Advances in computational PIR
The security of their scheme was based on the well-studied Quadratic residuosity problem. In 1999, Christian Cachin, Silvio Micali and Markus Stadler achieved poly-logarithmic communication complexity. The security of their system is based on the Phi-hiding assumption. The security of his system reduces to the semantic security of a length-flexible additively homomorphic cryptosystem like the Damgård–Jurik cryptosystem. In 2005 Craig Gentry and Zulfikar Ramzan achieved log-squared communication complexity which retrieves log-square (consecutive) bits of the database. The security of their scheme is also based on a variant of the Phi-hiding assumption.

All previous sublinear-communication computational PIR protocol required linear computational complexity of  public-key operations. In 2009, Helger Lipmaa designed a computational PIR protocol with communication complexity  and worst-case computation of  public-key operations. Amortization techniques that retrieve non-consecutive bits have been considered by Yuval Ishai, Eyal Kushilevitz, Rafail Ostrovsky and Amit Sahai.

As shown by Ostrovsky and Skeith, the schemes by Kushilevitz and Ostrovsky  and Lipmaa  use similar ideas based on homomorphic encryption. The Kushilevitz and Ostrovsky protocol is based on the Goldwasser–Micali cryptosystem while the protocol by Lipmaa is based on the Damgård–Jurik cryptosystem.

Advances in information theoretic PIR
Achieving information theoretic security requires the assumption that there are multiple non-cooperating servers, each having a copy of the database. Without this assumption, any information-theoretically secure PIR protocol requires an amount of communication that is at least the size of the database n. Multi-server PIR protocols tolerant of non-responsive or malicious/colluding servers are called robust or Byzantine robust respectively. These issues were first considered by Beimel and Stahl (2002). An ℓ-server system that can operate where only k of the servers respond, ν of the servers respond incorrectly, and which can withstand up to t colluding servers without revealing the client's query is called "t-private ν-Byzantine robust k-out-of-ℓ PIR" [DGH 2012]. It is based on an earlier protocol of Goldberg that uses Shamir's Secret Sharing to hide the query. Goldberg has released a C++ implementation on SourceForge.

Relation to other cryptographic primitives
One-way functions are necessary, but not known to be sufficient, for nontrivial (i.e., with sublinear communication) single database computationally private information retrieval. In fact, such a protocol was proved by Giovanni Di Crescenzo, Tal Malkin and Rafail Ostrovsky to imply oblivious transfer (see below).

Oblivious transfer, also called symmetric PIR, is PIR with the additional restriction that the user may not learn any item other than the one she requested. It is termed symmetric because both the user and the database have a privacy requirement.

Collision-resistant cryptographic hash functions are implied by any one-round computational PIR scheme, as shown by Ishai, Kushilevitz and Ostrovsky.

PIR variations
The basic motivation for Private Information Retrieval is a family of two-party protocols in which one of the parties (the sender) owns a database, and the other part (the receiver) wants to query it with certain privacy restrictions and warranties. So, as a result of the protocol, if the receiver wants the i-th value in the database he  must learn the i-th entry, but the sender must learn nothing about i. In a general PIR protocol, a computationally unbounded sender can learn nothing about i so privacy is theoretically preserved. Since the PIR problem was posed, different approaches to its solution have been pursued and some variations were proposed.
 
A CPIR (Computationally Private Information Retrieval) protocol is similar to a PIR protocol: the receiver retrieves an element chosen by him from the sender's database, so that the sender obtains no knowledge about which element was transferred. The only difference is that privacy is safeguarded against a polynomially bounded sender.

A CSPIR (Computationally Symmetric Private Information Retrieval) protocol is used in a similar scenario in which a CPIR protocol is used. If the sender owns a database, and the receiver wants to get the i-th value in this database, at the end of the execution of a SPIR protocol, the receiver should have learned nothing about values in the database other than the i-th one.

PIR implementations
Numerous Computational PIR and Information theoretic PIR schemes in the literature have been implemented. Here is an incomplete list:

 MuchPIR is a CPIR implementation as a Postgres C/C++ Extension [GitHub, 2021].
 SealPIR is a fast CPIR implementation [ACLS 2018].
 Popcorn is a PIR implementation tailored for media [GCMSAW 2016].
 Percy++ includes implementations of [AG 2007, DGH 2012, CGKS 1998, Goldberg 2007, HOG 2011, LG 2015].
 RAID-PIR is an implementation of the ITPIR scheme of [DHS 2014].
 XPIR is a fast CPIR implementation [ABFK 2014].
 upPIR is an ITPIR implementation [Cappos 2013].

Notes

See also 
 k-anonymity
 Locally decodable code

References

 A. Beimel, Y. Ishai, E. Kushilevitz, and J.-F. Raymond. Breaking the  barrier for information-theoretic private information retrieval. Proceedings of the 43rd Annual IEEE Symposium on Foundations of Computer Science, Vancouver, Canada, pages 261–270, 2002.
 A. Beimel and Y. Stahl, Robust information-theoretic private information retrieval, in Proceedings of the 3rd International Conference on Security in Communication Networks (SCN'02), pp. 326–341, 2003.  Cite is from DGH 2012, op. cit.
 [DGH 2012] Casey Devet, Ian Goldberg, and Nadia Heninger, Optimally Robust Private Information Retrieval, 21st USENIX Security Symposium, August 2012.
 [AG 2007] C. Aguilar-Melchor and P. Gaborit. A lattice-based computationally-efficient private information retrieval protocol, Western European Workshop on Research in Cryptology (WEWoRC), 2007.
 [CGKS 1998] B. Chor, O. Goldreich, E. Kushilevitz, and M. Sudan, Private information retrieval, Journal of the ACM, 45(6):965–981, 1998.
 [Goldberg 2007] I. Goldberg, Improving the robustness of private information retrieval, IEEE Symposium on Security and Privacy (S&P), 2007.
 [HOG 2011] R. Henry, F. Olumofin, and I. Goldberg, Practical PIR for electronic commerce, ACM Conference on Computer and Communications Security (CCS), 2011.
 [LG 2015] W. Lueks and I. Goldberg, Sublinear scaling for multi-client private information retrieval, International Conference on Financial Cryptography and Data Security (FC), 2015.
 [DHS 2014] D. Demmler, A. Herzberg, and T. Schneider, RAID-PIR: Practical multi-server PIR, In Cloud computing security workshop (CCSW), 2014.
 [ABFK 2014] C. Aguilar-Melchor, J. Barrier, L. Fousse, and M.-O. Killijian, "XPIR: Private Information Retrieval for Everyone", Cryptology ePrint Archive, Report 2014/1025, 2014.
 [GCMSAW 2016] T. Gupta, N. Crooks, W. Mulhern, S. Setty, L. Alvisi, and M. Walfish,  Scalable and private media consumption with Popcorn. USENIX NSDI, March 2016.
 [Cappos 2013] J. Cappos, Avoiding theoretical optimality to efficiently and privately retrieve security updates, International Conference on Financial Cryptography and Data Security (FC), 2013.
 Sergey Yekhanin. New locally decodable codes and private information retrieval schemes, 2006.
 [ACLS 2018] S. Angel, H. Chen, K. Laine, S. Setty, PIR with compressed queries and amortized query processing, IEEE Symposium on Security and Privacy (S&P), 2018.

External links
 Helger Lipmaa's web links on oblivious transfer and PIR        
 William Gasarch's website on PIR including survey articles
 Rafail Ostrovsky's website contaiting PIR articles and surveys

Cryptographic primitives
Theory of cryptography